William Dunlap (1766–1839) was a pioneer of American theater.

 William Dunlap may also refer to:

 William Dunlap Simpson (1823–1890), Governor of South Carolina
 William Claiborne Dunlap (1798–1872), U.S. Representative from Tennessee
 William R. Dunlap, American artist, arts commentator and educator
 William B. Dunlap, former Democratic member of the Pennsylvania State Senate
 Bill Dunlap (William James Dunlap, 1909–1980), Major League Baseball player